Amna Suleiman is a teacher and advocate for women's cycling in Gaza. As of 2016, she leads the only women's cycling club in Gaza.

Suleiman was born in Damascus, Syria and moved to Gaza in 1990s. 

Role in women's cycling
In the region where Amna Suleiman cycles, the Gaza strip, the custom is for women to not ride their bike past the age of puberty. Suleiman began cycling in 2015 for health reasons and to remind herself of better times in her childhood. Soon after, she established what is considered to be the first women's cycling club riding under the Hamas party's administration in Gaza.

Women's participation in sports has been restricted in the Gaza strip since the Hamas party came to power. According to Ahmad Muheisin, an official in Gaza’s youth and sports ministry office, women's cycling is considered to be a “violation” of Gazan values. Some have noted that it was more common for women to ride bikes in Gaza before the mid-1980s.

Suleiman advocates for women to continue riding bicycles after puberty, and has been quoted in The New York Times telling young women in Gaza that they should insist to their future husbands permission to cycle be a condition of their marriage. In 2016 she was profiled by BBC News as part of their BBC 100 Women series. She says she hopes that one day women will be able ride a bicycle without stigma and disapproval.

References

Living people
BBC 100 Women
1980s births
People from Gaza City
Cycling advocates